Jentzsch is a German surname. Notable people with the surname include:
Heber Jentzsch (born 1935), American Scientologist
Heinz Jentzsch (1920–2012), German horse trainer
Herlind Jentzsch, the mother of Angela Merkel
Simon Jentzsch (born 1976), German footballer
Willi Jentzsch, father of Herlind and Merkel's grandfather

German-language surnames